Santa Cruz (Portuguese for Holy Cross) is a parish in the municipality of Lagoa in the Azores. The population in 2011 was 3,671, in an area of 14.27 km². It contains the localities Cabo da Vila and Remédios.

References

Parishes of Lagoa, Azores